The Holcomb Court Apartments are a historic apartment complex at 2201 Main Street in Little Rock, Arkansas.  It is a U-shaped two story brick building, with concrete trim and a parapetted flat roof.  Entrances are located on the courtyard side of the side wings, in projecting sections with pedimented concrete surrounds.  The building houses twenty units, with many original design features surviving.  Built in 1925, it is one of the city's few largescale apartment buildings built during the 1920s.

The building was listed on the National Register of Historic Places in 1995.

See also
National Register of Historic Places listings in Little Rock, Arkansas

References

Apartment buildings on the National Register of Historic Places in Arkansas
Houses completed in 1925
Houses in Little Rock, Arkansas
National Register of Historic Places in Little Rock, Arkansas
Individually listed contributing properties to historic districts on the National Register in Arkansas
American Craftsman architecture in Arkansas